Pierre-Célestin Nihorimbere (born 11 January 1993) is a male Burundian long-distance runner. He competed in the marathon event at the 2015 World Championships in Athletics in Beijing, China.

See also
 Burundi at the 2015 World Championships in Athletics

References

External links

Burundian male marathon runners
Burundian male long-distance runners
Living people
Place of birth missing (living people)
1993 births
World Athletics Championships athletes for Burundi
Date of birth missing (living people)
20th-century Burundian people
21st-century Burundian people